Chlenomorpha is a genus of moths in the family Geometridae.

Species
 Chlenomorpha lygdina (Turner, 1917)
 Chlenomorpha sciogramma Lower, 1918
 Chlenomorpha trisyneura (Lower, 1903)

References
 Chlenomorpha at Markku Savela's Lepidoptera and Some Other Life Forms
 Natural History Museum Lepidoptera genus database

Ennominae